Prince Mikhail Mikhailovich Golitsyn  or  Galitzin  (tr. ; 1 November 1675 in Moscow – 10 December 1730) was a Russian Imperial field marshal (1725) and a president of the College of War (1728—1730). He was also known as a governor of Finland (1714–1721) during the "Great Discord". From 1728 he was a member of the Supreme Privy Council. He was the son of Mikhail Andreyevich Golitsyn and spouse of Tatyana Borisovna Golitsyna.

See also 
 Asteroid 7161 Golitsyn was named after him.
 A park in Moscow, established on the site of Golitsyn's city mansion and public garden.

References 

Field marshals of Russia
1675 births
1730 deaths
Military personnel from Moscow
Mikhail Mikhailovich
17th-century Russian military personnel
18th-century military personnel from the Russian Empire
18th-century politicians from the Russian Empire
Members of the Supreme Privy Council
Russian princes